Mesa Chorio is a village in the Paphos District of Cyprus, located 1 km east of Mesogi.

Topography 
A small settlement standing at an elevation of 315 meters on the outskirts of the city, it offers views of the region and the beaches of the area. Mesa Chorio Paphou is just a stone’s throw away from the urban centers’ infrastructure. There the visitor will find accommodations and villas for rent, modern buildings with all the comforts, and can eat in the well known tavern of the village that serves home-made mezedes (appetisers) and traditional dishes.

Mesa Chorio Paphou is bordered by Mesogi, Armou and can be a wonderful base for excursions to the surrounding area and the famous archaeological sites of Paphos.

Elevation
Mesa Chorio has an elevation of 312 m.

Nearby villages 
Mesogi 1 km

Armou 3.8 km

Tsada 4.9 km

References

Communities in Paphos District